Eamon Dee was an Irish Sinn Féin politician. He was elected unopposed as a Sinn Féin Teachta Dála (TD) to the 2nd Dáil at the 1921 elections for the Waterford–Tipperary East constituency. He opposed the Anglo-Irish Treaty and voted against it. 

He stood as an anti-Treaty Sinn Féin candidate (with Vincent White, Cathal Brugha and Séumas Robinson for Waterford-East Tipperary at the 1922 general election but was not elected.

References

Year of birth missing
Year of death missing
Early Sinn Féin TDs
Members of the 2nd Dáil